Sugandha Shaktipeeth, a temple of the Goddess Sunanda, is located in the village of Shikarpur, 10 miles north of Barisal, in Bangladesh. This Hindu temple is one of the Shakti Peethas.

The main festival is Shiva-Chaturdashi (on the 14th moon of March).

The Temple as a Shakti Peeth

The mythology of Daksha yaga and Sati's self immolation had immense significance in shaping the ancient Sanskrit literature and even had impact on the culture of India. It led  to the development of the concept of Shakti Peethas and there by strengthening Shaktism. Enormous mythological stories in puranas took the Daksha yaga as the reason for its origin. It is an important incident in Shaivism resulting in the emergence of Shree Parvati in the place of Sati Devi and making Shiva a grihastashrami (house holder) leading to the origin of Ganapathy and Subrahmanya.

Shakti Peethas are shrines or divine places of the Mother Goddess. These are places that are believes to have enshrined with the presence of Shakti due to the falling of body parts of the corpse of Sati Devi, when Lord Shiva carried it and wandered throughout Aryavartha in sorrow. There are 51 Shakti Peeth linking to the 51 alphabets in Sanskrit. Each temple have shrines for Shakti and  Kalabhairava and mostly the each temple associates different names to Shakti and  Kalabhairava in that temple.

Legend
Sati, was the first wife of Shiva as the first incarnation of Parvati. She was the daughter of King Daksha and Queen (the daughter of Brahma). She committed self-immolation at the sacrificial fire of a yagna performed by her father Daksha as she felt seriously distraught by her father's insult of her husband and also to her by not inviting both of them for the yagna. Shiva was so grieved after hearing of the death of his wife that he danced around the world in a Tandav Nritya (“devastating penance” or dance of destruction) carrying Sati's dead body over his shoulders. Perturbed by this situation and in order to bring Shiv to a state of normalcy, it was then Vishnu who decided to use his Sudarshan Chakra (the rotating knife s carried on his finger tip). He dismembered Sati's body with the chakra into several pieces and wherever her body fell on the earth, the place was consecrated as a divine shrine oo Shakthi Peeth with deities of Sati (Parvati) and Shiva. These locations have become famous pilgrimage places as Pithas or Shakthi Pithas, and are found scattered all over the subcontinent including Pakistan, Bangladesh, Sri Lanka and Nepal, apart from India. Sati is also known as Devi or Shakthi, and with blessings of Vishnu she was reborn as the daughter of Himavat or Himalayas and hence named as Parvati (daughter of mountains). She was born on the 14th day of the bright half of the month of Mrigashīrsha, which marks the Shivarathri (Shiva's night) festival.

References

Shakti Peethas
Hindu temples in Barisal district
Hindu pilgrimage sites in Bangladesh